Politics of India works within the framework of the country's Constitution. India is a parliamentary secular democratic republic in which the president of India is the head of state & first citizen of India and the prime minister of India is the head of government. It is based on the federal structure of government, although the word is not used in the Constitution itself. India follows the dual polity system, i.e. federal in nature, that consists of the central authority at the centre and states at the periphery. The Constitution defines the organizational powers and limitations of both central and state governments; it is well recognised, fluid (Preamble of the Constitution being rigid and to dictate further amendments to the Constitution) and considered supreme, i.e. the laws of the nation must conform to it.

There is a provision for a bicameral legislature consisting of an upper house, the Rajya Sabha (Council of States), which represents the states of the Indian federation, and a lower house, the Lok Sabha (House of the People), which represents the people of India as a whole. The Constitution provides for an independent judiciary, which is headed by the Supreme Court. The court's mandate is to protect the Constitution, to settle disputes between the central government and the states, to settle inter-state disputes, to nullify any central or state laws that go against the Constitution and to protect the fundamental rights of citizens, issuing writs for their enforcement in cases of violation.

There are 543 members in the Lok Sabha, who are elected using plurality voting (first past the post) system from 543 single-member constituencies. There are 245 members in the Rajya Sabha, out of which 233 are elected through indirect elections by single transferable vote by the members of the state legislative assemblies; 12 other members are elected/nominated by the President of India. Governments are formed through elections held every five years (unless otherwise specified), by parties that secure a majority of members in their respective lower houses (Lok Sabha in the central government and Vidhan Sabha in states). India had its first general election in 1951, which was won by the Indian National Congress, a political party that went on to dominate subsequent elections until 1977, when a non-Congress government was formed for the first time in independent India. The 1990s saw the end of single-party domination and the rise of coalition governments. The latest 17th Lok Sabha elections was conducted in seven phases from 11 April 2019 to 19 May 2019 by the Election commission of India. That elections once again brought back single-party rule in the country, with the Bharatiya Janata Party (BJP) being able to claim a majority in the Lok Sabha.

In recent decades, Indian politics has become a dynastic affair. Possible reasons for this could be the party stability, absence of party organisations, independent civil society associations that mobilise support for the parties and centralised financing of elections.

Political parties and alliances 

When compared to other democracies, India has had a large number of political parties during its history under democratic governance. It has been estimated that over 200 parties were formed after India became independent in 1947. And as per the current publication report dated 23 September 2021 from the Election Commission of the India, the total number of parties registered was 2858, with 9 national parties and 54 state parties, and 2796 unrecognized parties working in country.  Leadership 2021 from Election Commission of India, the total number of parties registered was 2858, with 8 national parties, 54 state parties and 2796 unrecognised parties. political parties in India is commonly interwoven with well-known families whose dynastic leaders actively play the dominant role in a party. Further, party leadership roles are often transferred to subsequent generations in the same families. The two main parties in India are the Bharatiya Janata Party, commonly known as the BJP, which is the leading right-wing nationalist party, and the Indian National Congress, commonly called the INC or Congress, which is the leading centre-left party. These two parties currently dominate national politics, both adhering their policies loosely to their places on the left–right political spectrum. At present, there are eight national parties and many more state parties.

Types of political parties 

Every political party in India, whether a national or regional/state party, must have a symbol and must be registered with the 
Election Commission of India. Symbols are used in the Indian political system to identify political parties in part so that illiterate people can vote by recognizing the party symbols.

In the current amendment to the Symbols Order, the commission has asserted the following five principles:
 A party, national or state, must have a legislative presence.
 A national party's legislative presence must be in the Lok Sabha. A state party's legislative presence must be in the State Assembly.
 A party can set up a candidate only from amongst its own members.
 A party that loses its recognition shall not lose its symbol immediately but shall be allowed to use that symbol for some time to try and retrieve its status. However, the grant of such facility to the party will not mean the extension of other facilities to it, as are available to recognized parties, such as free time on Doordarshan or AIR, free supply of copies of electoral rolls, etc.
 Recognition should be given to a party only on the basis of its own performance in elections and not because it is a splinter group of some other recognized party.

A political party shall be eligible to be recognized as a national party if:
 in addition, it wins at least four seats in the House of the People from any State or States.
 or it wins at least two percent (2%) seats in the House of the People (i.e. 11 seats in the existing House having 543 members), and these members are elected from at least three different states.

Likewise, a political party shall be entitled to be recognized as a state party, if:
 it secures at least six percent (6%) of the valid votes polled in the state at a general election, either to the Lok Sabha or to the Legislative Assembly of the State concerned; and
 in addition, it wins at least two seats in the Legislative Assembly of the state concerned.
 or it wins at least three percent (3%) of the total number of seats in the Legislative Assembly of the state, or at least three seats in the Assembly, whichever is more.

Party proliferation
Although a strict anti-defection law had been passed in 1984, there has been a continued tendency amongst politicians to float their own parties rather than join a broad based party such as the Congress or the BJP. Between the 1984 and 1989 elections, the number of parties contesting elections increased from 33 to 113. In the decades since, this fragmentation has continued.

Alliances

India has a history of party alliances and breakdown of alliances. However, there are three party alliances regularly aligning on a national level in competing for Government positions. The member parties work in harmony for gratifying national interests, although parties can jump ships.

 National Democratic Alliance (NDA) - Right-wing coalition led by BJP was formed in 1998 after the elections. NDA formed a government, although the government didn't last long as AIADMK withdrew support from it resulting in 1999 general elections, in which NDA won and resumed power. The coalition government went on to complete the full five-years term, becoming the first non-Congress government to do so. In the 2014 General Elections, NDA once again returned to powers for the second time, with a historic mandate of 336 out of 543 Lok Sabha seats. BJP itself won 282 seats, thereby electing Narendra Modi as the head of the government. In a historic win, the NDA stormed to power for the third term in 2019 with a combined strength of 353 seats, with the BJP itself winning an absolute majority with 303 seats
 United Progressive Alliance (UPA) - Centre-left coalition led by Indian National Congress (INC); this alliance was created after the 2004 general elections, with the alliance forming the Government. The alliance even after losing some of its members, was re-elected in 2009 General Elections with Manmohan Singh as head of the government. The alliance has been in the opposition since the 2014 elections, with the INC being the principal opposition party, but without the official status of the Leader of the Opposition since they failed to win the minimum required seats.

Corruption
India has seen political corruption for decades. Democratic institutions soon became federally owned, dissent was eliminated and a majority of citizens paid the price. The political corruption in India is weakening its democracy and has led to the erosion of trust by the general public in the political system. A good amount of money is required in elections which is source of political-capitalist nexus.

Candidate selection
Pre-election alliances are common in India with parties deciding to share seats. This is seen mainly on a state by state basis rather than on the national level. Candidate selection starts after seat sharing has been agreed by alliance fellows.

Indian political parties have low level of internal party democracy and therefore, in Indian elections, both at the state or national level, party candidates are typically selected by the party elites, more commonly called the party high command. The party elites use a number of criteria for selecting candidates. These include the ability of the candidates to finance their own election, their educational attainment, and the level of organization the candidates have in their respective constituencies. Quite often the last criterion is associated with candidate criminality.

Local governance 
Panchayati Raj Institutions or Local self-government bodies play a crucial role in Indian politics, as it focuses on grassroot-level administration in India.

On 24 April 1993, the Constitutional (73rd Amendment) Act, 1992 came into force to provide constitutional status to the Panchayati Raj institutions. This Act was extended to Panchayats in the tribal areas of eight states, namely Andhra Pradesh, Bihar, Gujarat, Himachal Pradesh, Maharashtra, Madhya Pradesh, Odisha and Rajasthan from 24 December 1996.

The Act aims to provide a three-tier system of Panchayati Raj for all States having a population of over 2 million, to hold Panchayat elections regularly every five years, to provide reservation of seats for Scheduled Castes, Scheduled Tribes and Women, to appoint State Finance Commission to make recommendations as regards the financial powers of the Panchayats and to constitute District Planning Committee to prepare a draft development plan for the district.

Role of political parties 

As with most other democracies, political parties represent different sections among the Indian society and regions, and their core values play a major role in the politics of India. Both the executive branch and the legislative branch of the government are run by the representatives of the political parties who have been elected through the elections. Through the electoral process, the people of India choose which representative and which political party should run the government. Through elections, any party may gain simple majority in the lower house. Coalitions are formed by the political parties in case no single party gains a simple majority in the lower house. Unless a party or a coalition have a majority in the lower house, a government cannot be formed by that party or the coalition.

India has a multi-party system, where there are a number of national as well as regional parties. A regional party may gain a majority and rule a particular state. If a party is represented in more than 4 states, it would be labelled a national party (subject to other criteria above). Out of the 72 years of India's independence, India has been ruled by the Congress party for 53 years as of January 2020.

The party enjoyed a parliamentary majority save for two brief periods during the 1970s and late 1980s. This rule was interrupted between 1977 and 1980, when the Janata Party coalition won the election owing to public discontent with the controversial state of emergency declared by the then Prime Minister Indira Gandhi. The Janata Dal won elections in 1989, but its government managed to hold on to power for only two years.

Between 1996 and 1998, there was a period of political flux with the government being formed first by the nationalist BJP followed by a left-leaning United Front coalition. In 1998, the BJP formed the National Democratic Alliance with smaller regional parties, and became the first non-INC and coalition government to complete a full five-year term. The 2004 elections saw the INC winning the largest number of seats to form a government leading the United Progressive Alliance, and supported by left-parties and those opposed to the BJP.

On 22 May 2004, Manmohan Singh was appointed the prime minister of India following the victory of the INC and the left front in the 2004 Lok Sabha election. The UPA ruled India without the support of the left front. Previously, Atal Bihari Vajpayee had taken office in October 1999 after a general election in which a BJP-led coalition of 13 parties called the National Democratic Alliance emerged with a majority. In May 2014, Narendra Modi of BJP was elected as the prime minister.

Formation of coalition governments reflects the transition in Indian politics away from the national parties toward smaller, more narrowly based regional parties. Some regional parties, especially in South India, are deeply aligned to the ideologies of the region unlike the national parties and thus the relationship between the central government and the state government in various states has not always been free of rancour. Disparity between the ideologies of the political parties ruling the centre and the state leads to severely skewed allocation of resources between the states.

Political issues

Social issues 

The lack of homogeneity in the Indian population causes division among different sections of the people based on religion, region, language, caste and ethnicity. This has led to the rise of political parties with agendas catering to one or a mix of these groups. Parties in India also target people who are not in favour of other parties and use them as an asset.

Some parties openly profess their focus on a particular group. For example, the Dravida Munnetra Kazhagam's and the All India Anna Dravida Munnetra Kazhagam's focus on the Tamil identity; Biju Janata Dal's championing of Odia people; the Shiv Sena's pro-Marathi agenda; Naga People's Front's demand for protection of Naga tribal identity; Telugu Desam Party's formation in the erstwhile Andhra Pradesh by N. T. Rama Rao demanding for rights and needs of people of the state only. Some other parties claim to be universal in nature, but tend to draw support from particular sections of the population. For example, the Rashtriya Janata Dal has a votebank among the Yadav and Muslim population of Bihar, while the Samajwadi Party has the same votebank in Uttar Pradesh and the All India Trinamool Congress does not have any significant support outside West Bengal and Meghalaya.

The narrow focus and votebank politics of most parties, even in the central government and state legislature, supplements national issues such as economic welfare and national security. Moreover, internal security is also threatened as incidences of political parties instigating and leading violence between two opposing groups of people is a frequent occurrence.

Economic problems 

Economic issues like unemployment and development are the main issues that influence politics. Garibi Hatao (eradicate poverty) has been a slogan of the Congress for a long time. BJP encourages a free market economy. The more popular slogan in this field is Sabka Saath, Sabka Vikas (Cooperation with all, progress of all). The Communist Party of India (Marxist) strongly supports left-wing politics like land-for-all, right to work and strongly opposes neoliberal policies such as globalisation, capitalism and privatisation.

Law and order 
Terrorism, Naxalism, religious violence and caste-related violence are important issues that affect the political environment of the Indian nation. Stringent anti-terror legislation such as TADA, POTA and MCOCA have received much political attention, both in favour and against, and some of these laws were disbanded eventually due to human rights violations. However, UAPA was amended in 2019 to negative effect vis-á-vis human rights.

Terrorism has affected politics India since its conception, be it the terrorism supported from Pakistan or the internal guerrilla groups such as Naxalites. In 1991 the former prime minister Rajiv Gandhi was assassinated during an election campaign. The suicide bomber was later linked to the Sri Lankan terrorist group Liberation Tigers of Tamil Eelam, as it was later revealed the killing was an act of vengeance for Rajiv Gandhi sending troops in Sri Lanka against them in 1987.

The Godhra train killings and the Babri Masjid demolition on 6 December 1992 resulted in nationwide communal riots in two months, with the worst occurring in Mumbai with at least 900 dead. The riots were followed by 1993 Bombay bombings, which resulted in more deaths.

Law and order issues, such as action against organised crime are issues which do not affect the outcomes of elections. On the other hand, there is a criminal–politician nexus. Many elected legislators have criminal cases against them. In July 2008, the Washington Post reported that nearly a fourth of the 540 Indian Parliament members faced criminal charges, "including human trafficking, child prostitution, immigration rackets, embezzlement, rape and even murder".

High political offices in India

President of India 

The Constitution of India lays down that the Head of State and Union Executive is the president of India. They are elected for a five-year term by an electoral college consisting of members of both Houses of Parliament and members of legislative assemblies of the states. The president is eligible for re-elections; however, in India's independent history, only one president has been re-elected – Dr Rajendra Prasad, who was also the first President of India.

The president appoints the prime minister of India from the party or coalition which commands maximum support of the Lok Sabha, on whose recommendation he/she nominates the other members of the Union Council of Ministers. The president also appoints judges of the Supreme Court and High Courts. It is on the president's recommendation that the Houses of Parliament meet, and only the president has the power to dissolve the Lok Sabha. Furthermore, no bill passed by Parliament can become law without the president's assent.

However, the role of the president of India is largely ceremonial. All the powers of the president mentioned above are exercised on recommendation of the Union Council of Ministers, and the president does not have much discretion in any of these matters. The president also does not have discretion in the exercise of their executive powers, as the real executive authority lies in the Cabinet. 

On 25 July 2022, Droupadi Murmu was sworn in as India's new president, becoming India's first tribal president. Although largely ceremonial post, Murmu’s election as tribal woman was historic.

Vice President of India 

The office of the vice-president of India is constitutionally the second most senior office in the country, after the president. The vice-president is also elected by an electoral college, consisting of members of both houses of Parliament. Dr. Sarvepalli Radhakrishnan was the first Vice President of India.

Like the president, the role of the vice-president is also ceremonial, with no real authority vested in him/her. The vice-president fills in a vacancy in the office of president (till the election of a new president). The only regular function is that the vice-president functions as the ex officio Chairman of the Rajya Sabha. No other duties/powers are vested in the office. The current vice-president is Jagdeep Dhankhar.

The Prime Minister and the Union Council of Ministers 

The Union Council of Ministers, headed by the prime minister, is the body with which the real executive power resides. The prime minister is the recognized head of the government. Pandit Jawaharlal Nehru was the first Prime Minister of India as well as the longest serving Prime Minister of India till date.

The Union Council of Ministers is the body of ministers with which the prime minister works with on a day-to-day basis. Work is divided between various ministers into various departments and ministries. The Union Cabinet is a smaller body of senior ministers which lies within the Union Council of Ministers, and is the most powerful set of people in the country, playing an instrumental role in legislation and execution alike.

All members of the Union Council of Ministers must be members of either House of Parliament at the time of appointment or must get elected/nominated to either House within six months of their appointment.

It is the Union Cabinet that co-ordinates all foreign and domestic policy of the Union. It exercises immense control over administration, finance, legislation, military, etc. The Head of the Union Cabinet is the prime minister. The current prime minister of India is Narendra Modi.

State governments 

India has a federal form of government, and hence each state also has its own government. The executive of each state is the governor (equivalent to the president of India), whose role is ceremonial. The real power resides with the chief minister (equivalent to the prime minister) and the State Council of Ministers. States may either have a unicameral or bicameral legislature, varying from state to state. The chief minister and other state ministers are also members of the legislature.

Political families 

Since the 1980s, Indian politics has become dynastic, possibly due to the absence of a party organization, independent civil society associations that mobilize support for the party, and centralized financing of elections. One example of dynastic politics has been the Nehru–Gandhi family which produced three Indian prime ministers. Family members have also led the Congress party for most of the period since 1978 when Indira Gandhi floated the then Congress(I) faction of the party. The ruling Bharatiya Janata Party also features several senior leaders who are dynasts. Dynastic politics is prevalent also in a number of political parties with regional presence such as All India Majlis-e-Ittehadul Muslimeen (AIMIM), All India Trinamool Congress (AITC), Bharat Rashtra Samithi (BRS), Desiya Murpokku Dravida Kazhagam (DMDK), Dravida Munnetra Kazhagam (DMK), Indian National Lok Dal (INLD), Jammu & Kashmir National Conference (JKNC),  Jammu and Kashmir Peoples Democratic Party (JKPDP), Janata Dal (Secular) (JD(S)), Jharkhand Mukti Morcha (JMM), National People's Party (NPP), Nationalist Congress Party (NCP), Pattali Makkal Katchi (PMK), Rashtriya Janata Dal (RJD), Rashtriya Lok Dal (RLD), Samajwadi Party (SP), Shiromani Akali Dal (SAD), Shiv Sena (SS), Telugu Desam Party (TDP) and Yuvajana Shramika Rythu Congress Party (YSRCP)..

See also 
 Government of India
 State governments of India
 Law of India
 Indian political scandals
 Disqualification of convicted representatives in India
 Political families of India
 List of think tanks in India
 History of democracy in ancient India
 Democracy in Chola Dynasty
 High command culture
 List of communist parties in India

References

Bibliography

Further reading 

 
 Chowdhuri, Satyabrata Rai. Leftism in India, 1917-1947 . Palgrave, U.K., 2007.
 Shively, W. Phillips. Power and Choice: An Introduction to Political Science—Chapter 14 Example: Parliamentary Government in India. McGraw Hill Higher Education, 2005
. 
 Mitra, Subrata K. and Singh, V.B.. Democracy and Social Change in India: A Cross-Sectional Analysis of the National Electorate. New Delhi: Sage Publications, 1999.  (India HB)  (U.S. HB).
 Shourie, Arun (2007). The parliamentary system: What we have made of it, what we can make of it. New Delhi: Rupa & Co.
 Shourie, Arun (2005). Governance and the sclerosis that has set in. New Delhi: ASA Publications.
 Tawa Lama-Rewal, Stéphanie. "Studying Elections in India: Scientific and Political Debates". ''South Asia Multidisciplinary Academic Journal, 3, 2009.

External links 

 Outline of the Indian Government

Politics of India